The Sheraton Nashville Downtown Hotel is a high-rise hotel and restaurant in downtown Nashville, Tennessee. Sheraton Nashville Downtown’s multimillion-dollar transformation was conceptualized by New York-based designer Anna Busta.

It is notable on the Nashville skyline for its prominent rooftop.

In August 2012, the hotel was acquired by the JRK Hotel Group, a subsidiary of JRK Property Holdings.

See also 

List of tallest buildings in Nashville

References

External links 
Sheraton Grand Nashville Downtown website
JRK Property Holdings

Skyscrapers in Nashville, Tennessee
Hotel buildings completed in 1975
Skyscraper hotels in Tennessee
Brutalist architecture in Tennessee